The Üechtland, alternatively spelled Üchtland and Uechtland, is a region in western Switzerland, where the cities of Bern and Fribourg are located. The French name  ("land of the Nuithones") is rarely used.

The name for the region is obsolete; today, it is only used to distinguish Fribourg from Freiburg (or ) in Germany. 

== Sources ==
 

Regions of Switzerland